Damburneya salicina is a species of plant in the family Lauraceae. It is found in Costa Rica and Panama.

References

salicina
Flora of Costa Rica
Flora of Panama
Taxonomy articles created by Polbot
Flora of the Talamancan montane forests